Anna Carmela Minuto (born 28 January 1969) is an Italian politician from Forza Italia who was elected to the Italian Senate in 2018.

Political career 
She resigned from the Senate on 2 December 2021.

References 

Living people
1969 births
21st-century Italian politicians
21st-century Italian women politicians
Senators of Legislature XVIII of Italy
Forza Italia (2013) senators
20th-century Italian women
Women members of the Senate of the Republic (Italy)